Parliamentary elections were held in Greece on 23 September 1853. Supporters of Antonios Kriezis won a majority of the 138 seats. Kriezis remained Prime Minister.

References

1853 elections in Europe
1853
1853 in Greece
September 1853 events
1850s in Greek politics